The City Uncovered with Evan Davis is a 2009 British documentary series.

Background
The City Uncovered deals with the history of finance, and the recent events of the financial crisis of 2007–2010. The three-part BBC series, presented by journalist Evan Davis, was a part of the "City Season" programming on the BBC. It aired on BBC 2 in the UK at 9 pm on Wednesday evenings between 14 and 28 January 2009. The episodes were shown again on BBC One days later. The title is a reference to the common name of the financial areas of London, known as The City, which is similar to places such as Wall Street in New York City.

Episode list

References

External links

BBC television documentaries
2009 British television series debuts